Leonardo Barker (born November 7, 1959 in Cristobal, Panama Canal Zone) is an American football player who was the first person born in Panama to play in the NFL. He played for the Cincinnati Bengals from 1984 until 1991. He played varsity football at Rainbow City/Cristobal in the Panama Canal Zone, then an unincorporated territory of the United States. From 2008 to 2010, he was the head coach of the Hornets of Roswell High School. He lives in Roswell, Georgia, with his family, teaches Spanish and linebacker coach for Blessed Trinity Catholic High School.

College career
Barker was a member of the New Mexico State University Aggies football team from 1979 to 1983. He was a starting (linebacker) every year he played and was second on the team in tackles his junior and senior seasons. At New Mexico State, Barker racked up 378 career tackles; enough to place him number four on the all-time Aggie list.  In 2003, Leo Barker was inducted into the New Mexico State University Intercollegiate Athletic Hall of Fame.

NFL career
He was drafted by the Cincinnati Bengals in the seventh round of the NFL draft in 1983. He played for the Bengals until 1992, when he retired. Barker was an integral part of the Bengals’ nickel-package defense. In 1989, Barker helped lead them to a league best 12-4 record and an appearance in Super Bowl XXIII.

References

1959 births
Living people
Sportspeople from Colón, Panama
Zonians
American football linebackers
New Mexico State Aggies football players
Cincinnati Bengals players
Players of American football from Georgia (U.S. state)
People from Roswell, Georgia
Sportspeople from Fulton County, Georgia